The July 1936 military uprising in Barcelona was a military uprising in Barcelona, the capital and largest city of Catalonia, Spain on 19 July 1936 which contributed to the start of the Spanish Civil War. Most of the Spanish Army officers in the city supported the coup, but the Civil Guard, the Assault Guard (Guardia de Asalto) and the Mossos d'Esquadra remained loyal to the Republican government. Furthermore, Barcelona was one of the strongholds of the anarchist union, the Confederación Nacional del Trabajo (CNT). The rebel troops were defeated after one day of bloody combat.

The defeat of the military coup in Barcelona was a great success for the Republic, although after the defeat of the Francoists it became clear that the workers' militias – in particular, the anarcho-syndicalist militias – were the ones that really controlled the city. The coup attempt marked the beginning of the Spanish Revolution and also the beginning of a harsh repression in Catalonia against those suspected of being "fascist" or opposed to the revolution.

Background

On 17–18 July a part of the Spanish Army, led by a group of officers (among them the generals José Sanjurjo, Francisco Franco, Emilio Mola, Manuel Goded Llopis and Gonzalo Queipo de Llano), tried to overthrow the Popular Front government of the Second Spanish Republic in the Spanish coup of July 1936. One of the main goals of the coup was to take control of the main cities of the country, among them Barcelona.

Opposing forces
In Barcelona, the plotters led by the General Fernández Burriel planned to use the troops of the garrisons in the periphery of the city, about 5000 men of the IV division of the Spanish Army in order to march towards the city center and join up in the Plaça de Catalunya. Then they would occupy the city and wait the arrival of General Goded. The general Llano de la Encomienda, commander of the IV division, stayed loyal to the government, but most of the officers supported the coup. Nevertheless, the Guardia Civil (Civil Guard) in Barcelona, led by General José Aranguren; the Guardia de Asalto; and the Catalan police, the Mossos d'Esquadra, led by Captain Frederic Escofet, (around 5000 men) remained loyal to the government. Also remaining loyal was El Prat air base, commanded by Colonel Felipe Díaz Sandino, whose planes bombed the rebel troops.

On 18 July news about a rising of the Army of Africa in the Spanish protectorate in Morocco reached Barcelona, but the president of the Generalitat of Catalonia, Lluís Companys, refused to give weapons to the workers and ordered anarchists carrying weapons to be detained. Nevertheless, the CNT, led by Buenaventura Durruti and Francisco Ascaso, assaulted some army depots and the prison ship Uruguay, and started to make home-made grenades and improvised armoured cars. Furthermore, Assault Guards handed out rifles to the CNT.

The fight in Barcelona
On 19 July, during the early hours of the day, a few hundred civilian volunteers, chiefly Carlist requetés led by José Cunill, reported to various military quarters, mostly the San Andreu barracks. Before dawn at some four in the morning, the officers in the Pedralbes Barrack told their soldiers that the government had ordered them to crush an anarchist rising in Barcelona. The troops left the Barracks and marched towards the Plaça de Catalunya, through the Avinguda Diagonal. Soon after, Companys received the news of the troops advancing towards the city. At five in the morning, the Montesa cavalry regiment, the Santiago dragoons regiment and a battery of the 7th light Regiment left their barracks and marched towards the Plaça de Catalunya, but the deployment of troops was badly co-ordinated and the junction of the rebels columns was never achieved. The rebel troops were attacked by snipers and with home-made bombs. The anarchists built barricades with paving stones in order to block the city center, and the Guardia Civil and the Assault Guards joined them against the rebel troops.

Some units were forced to retreat into their barracks and others never broke into the streets, but an infantry column, led by Major Lopez Amor, reached the Plaça de Catalunya and occupied the telephone exchange, and other units occupied the Hotel Colón and the Ritz and barricaded themselves. At 11 a.m., General Goded arrived from Mallorca, went to the captain-general's headquarters, and arrested the commander of the IV Division, General Llano de la Encomienda, but the situation of the rebel troops was hopeless.

After bloody combats in the Plaça de Catalunya and other parts of the city, the anarchists and the loyal troops surrounded all the rebel-held buildings in the city. The Civil Guards, led by the Colonel Antonio Escobar, assaulted the Hotel Colón and the Ritz and the anarchists occupied the telephone exchange. After that, Goded surrendered and broadcast a statement over the radio to prevent further bloodshed. By nightfall, the rebel troops only held the Drassanes barracks, near the port and the Andreu barracks. The next morning the anarchists, led by Buenaventura Durruti, assaulted the barracks and the rebel troops surrendered. Ascaso died during the assault, but the CNT seized 30,000 rifles in the barracks. There were over 500 deaths and 3,000 wounded.

Aftermath
After the defeat of the coup in Barcelona, the CNT was the real power in the city until the May Days in 1937. After the coup, the CNT had 30,000 armed men and women in Barcelona, while the government had only 5000.

Political implications 
After the failed uprising in Barcelona, the city was practically in the hands of the workers' militias, which had obtained the armament of the military arsenals and had a force of armed men far superior to the security forces with which both the Central Government as the Generalitat could count. Hugh Thomas believes that at the end of the military rebellion in Barcelona the security forces had 5,000 armed men, while the CNT-FAI had about 30,000 armed men. Thus, although the loyal forces had managed to defeat the insurgents, the reality was that the workers' movement had taken control of the city and had supplanted the authority and powers of Catalan government and Spanish State.

Due to this situation, the same night of 20 July the anarchist leaders Juan García Oliver, Diego Abad de Santillán and Buenaventura Durruti visited Lluís Companys on the occasion of the new situation that had been created. Companys could have used the security forces to force the workers to return the rifles and ammunition they had confiscated, but he was in dangerous territory and preferred to offer the anarchists the possibility of taking power or collaborating with the state. The anarchist leaders, despite the historical experience of the liberal movement, opted for the second option, although the state would have a fairly limited role as would be demonstrated in the following months. From this meeting between Companys and the main anarchist leaders would come the creation of the Central Committee of Antifascist Militias of Catalonia (CCMA), which would be the real government in Barcelona for many months. This marked the beginning of what has become known as the Spanish Revolution.

The situation would not be, far from it, consolidated and a large number of conflicts and confrontations would take place in the city during the following months, in an escalation that would end up leading to the May Days. The solid implementation of the control of the republican government over Barcelona allowed its counterintelligence agencies to significantly reduce the activities of the fifth column affects the rebel faction, as well as discover and arrest almost all the leaders of Falange that had survived the failed uprising.

Repression and violence in the rear 
The officers and main leaders of the rebellion who had been arrested were initially taken to Castle of Montjuïc, where they remained until 26 July they were transferred to the prison ship   Uruguay ,  in the city's port. During the time they were imprisoned on the prison ship, the prisoners were treated correctly: they were allowed to sit on the deck and read novels from the ship's library, however the provocative attitude  of many of the detainees were grounds for the authorities to end these privileges.  The officers involved in the conspiracy were tried in court martial by the republican authorities, aboard the  Uruguay . The general Manuel Cardenal presided over the military tribunal that judged the rebellious officers.  On August 11, Generals Goded and Fernández Burriel were tried for having directed the military rebellion, condemned to death and shot the next day in the moat of Montjuic Castle.  The general  Legorburu would also end up being executed  A few days later, on August 26, after being tried in court martial, other ringleaders of the rebellion were also shot: the Infantry commander  López-Amor, and the captains  López Belda,  López Varela and  Lizcano de la Rosa.

See also 

 List of Spanish Republican military equipment of the Spanish Civil War
 List of Spanish Nationalist military equipment of the Spanish Civil War

Notes

References

Bibliography

 

Battles of the Spanish Civil War
1936 in Catalonia
Conflicts in 1936
Military history of Barcelona
1930s in Barcelona
Spanish Civil War in Catalonia
July 1936 events